Pietrowice may refer to:

Pietrowice, Opole Voivodeship in Opole Voivodeship, Poland
Pietrowice Małe in Lower Silesian Voivodeship, Poland
Pietrowice Wielkie in Silesian Voivodeship, Poland
Gmina Pietrowice Wielkie

See also
Piotrowice (disambiguation)
Petrovice (disambiguation)
Petrovce (disambiguation)